The 1971 New Mexico Lobos football team was an American football team that represented the University of New Mexico in the Western Athletic Conference (WAC) during the 1971 NCAA University Division football season.  In their fourth season under head coach Rudy Feldman, the Lobos compiled a 6–3–2 record (5–1 against WAC opponents) and outscored opponents by a total of 341 to 292.

Rocky Long, Herman Fredenberg, and Bob Gaines were the team captains. The team's statistical leaders included Rocky Long with 876 passing yards and 78 points scored, Fred Henry with 1,129 rushing yards, and Ken Smith with 281 receiving yards.

Schedule

References

New Mexico
New Mexico Lobos football seasons
New Mexico Lobos football